List of international public law topics:

This is a comprehensive list of pages dealing with public international law, i.e. those areas of law dealing with the United Nations System and the Law of Nations. It is being started as a sublist as it is a specialized area of law that often does not interact with general legal topics. There is also a separate List of treaties.

 Berne Convention for the Protection of Literary and Artistic Works
 Convention on Biological Diversity 
 Convention on the Rights of the Child 
 Crime against international law
 Declaration of war 
 Directive on harmonising the term of copyright protection
 EU Copyright Directive 
 European Union law
 European Company Statute
 General Agreement on Tariffs and Trade
 Geneva Conventions
 History of public international law
 Human Rights Committee
 International copyright
 International Court of Justice 
 International Criminal Tribunal for the Former Yugoslavia 
 International Criminal Tribunal for Rwanda 
 International Criminal Court
 International Covenant on Civil and Political Rights
 International Covenant on Economic, Social, and Cultural Rights 
 International human rights law
 International humanitarian law
 International judicial institutions
 International Prize Court 
 International trade law
 Laws of war
 List of treaties
 Madrid Agreement 
 Notable UN General Assembly Resolutions 
 Permanent Court of Arbitration
 Refugees 
 Treaty of Maastricht
 UN Economic and Social Council 
 United Nations High Commissioner for Refugees
 United Nations Relief and Works Agency for Palestine Refugees in the Near East
 United Nations System
 Universal Copyright Convention
 WIPO Copyright Treaty
 WIPO Performances and Phonograms Treaty
 World Health Organization
 World Intellectual Property Organization
 World Trade Organization

Law-related lists
International public law topics